Elaphria deltoides is a species of cutworm or dart moth in the family Noctuidae. It is found in North America.

The MONA or Hodges number for Elaphria deltoides is 9679.1.

References

Further reading

 
 
 

Noctuinae
Moths described in 1880